, also known as "My 3 Daughters", is a Japanese manga series written and illustrated by Pretz Matsumoto from October 2005 to April 2011, which later became an anime television series from April 4, 2008, until December 28, 2010.

Staff
 Script: Jin Tanaka, Naoki Koga, Michiyo Yamamoto,  Midori Kashiwagi, Akari Tsukino, Yuta Urasawa, Isao Murayama,  Hiroyuki Kurokawa, Masayuki Odajima, Takeshi Mabuchi, Yoichi Takahashi, Ayako Ogata, Mutsumi Ito
 Storyboards: Iku Ishiguro, Satoru Iriyoshi, Yuki Kinoshita, Kenji Yokoyama, Hiro Matsusaka, Naotoshi Shida, Naoyuki Itō, Sayo Aoi, Eisaku Inoue, Toru Yamada, Kiyotaka Isako, Tetsuaki Matsuda

References

External links 
 

2008 anime television series debuts
2010 Japanese television series endings
Anime series based on manga
Comedy anime and manga
Drama anime and manga
Shōnen manga
Toei Animation television
TV Tokyo original programming